

Disambiguation 
Bernabé Rivera may refer to
Bernabé Rivera (footballer), Paraguayan soccer player
Bernabé Rivera, Uruguayan soldier (Spanish-language Wikipedia)

 
Bernabé Rivera is a village in the Artigas Department of northern Uruguay.

Geography

History
Its earlier name was "Allende" or "Yacaré", and on 26 May 1924, it was declared a "Pueblo" (village) by the Act of Ley Nº 7.720. It was renamed to "Bernabé Rivera" on 11 January 1956 by the Act of Ley Nº 12.271.

Population
In 2011 Bernabe Rivera had a population of 380.
 
Source: Instituto Nacional de Estadística de Uruguay

References

External links
INE map of Bernabe Rivera

Populated places in the Artigas Department